Qabagh Kandi (also Romanized as Qaban Kandī) is a village in Zarrineh Rud-e Jonubi Rural District, in the Central District of Miandoab County, West Azerbaijan Province, Iran. At the 2006 census, its population was 852, in 188 families.

References 

Populated places in Miandoab County